"Angelicus" is the first single from Delerium's album Nuages du Monde featuring singer Isabel Bayrakdarian.
The single was released only as a promotional single in 2007; Its release to DJs enabled the track to reach number one on the US Hot Dance Club Play chart during the week ending March 31, 2007.

Remixes were made by Andy Moor, Morgan Page, Redanka and Panoptica.

A music video was also directed by Stephen Scott and released, despite the lack of a commercial single release. Scott directed the video for After All before. Just like After All this video uses a post-apocalyptic city setting. Isabel Bayrakdarian appears in the video.

Track listing
US promo CD (2006)
 "Angelicus" (Andy Moor Full Length Mix) – 8:17
 "Angelicus" (Morgan Page Remix) – 7:54
 "Angelicus" (Redanka Remix) – 7:43
 "Angelicus" (Panoptica Remix) – 5:46
 "Angelicus" (Andy Moor Radio Edit) – 4:02
 "Angelicus" (Album Version) – 5:10

Digital release (2007)
 "Angelicus" (Andy Moor Full Length Mix) – 8:17
 "Angelicus" (Morgan Page Remix) – 7:54
 "Angelicus" (Redanka Remix) – 7:43
 "Angelicus" (Panoptica Remix) – 5:46

Charts

See also
 List of number-one dance singles of 2007 (U.S.)

References

2007 singles
Delerium songs
2006 songs
Songs written by Bill Leeb
Songs written by Rhys Fulber
Nettwerk Records singles